Novel Explosives by Jim Gauer (Zerogram Press, 2016) is a novel that tells three interrelated stories set in Los Angeles, Ciudad Juárez, and Guanajuato.

The novel is named after a thermobaric weapon introduced by the US Marine Corps during the 2003 Invasion of Iraq called a "Novel Explosive" (SMAW-NE).

There are many references to the poet Fernando Pessoa.

Jeff Bursey writing for Numéro Cinq described the novel as having Quentin Tarantino-like action sequences paired with metafictional flourishes.

References

External links
 Excerpt at KCRW
 Interview at The Millions

2016 American novels
American philosophical novels
Postmodern novels
Novels set in Los Angeles
Novels set in Mexico